Liu Shipei (24 June 1884 – 20 December 1919) was a philologist, Chinese anarchist, and revolutionary activist. While he and his wife, He Zhen were in exile in Japan he became a fervent nationalist. He then saw the doctrines of anarchism as offering a path to social revolution while remaining intent on preserving China's cultural essence, especially Taoism and the records of China's pre-imperial history. In 1909 he unexpectedly returned to China to work for the Manchu Qing government and after 1911 supported Yuan Shikai's attempt to become emperor. After Yuan's death in 1916 he joined the faculty at Peking University. He died of tuberculosis in 1919.

Career
Liu came from a family of prominent Qing dynasty scholars and officials. His father, uncle, grandfather, and great-grandfather were prominent in the school of Han learning which grounded their political reforms in study of the classics. They felt an affinity with such early Qing figures as Wang Fuzhi and the School of Evidential Scholarship. Early family education gave him the philological tools needed to study ancient texts, especially the Zuozhuan, a rich chronicle of pre-imperial China. Liu passed the first and second levels of the imperial examinations, but when he did not succeed at the highest level, he instead went to live in Shanghai in 1902-1904. There he met the revolutionaries Zhang Binglin and Cai Yuanpei and published essays calling for driving the Manchus out of China. He took the name GuangHan (光漢), or "Restore the Han," and developed the doctrine of guocui, or "national essence," which set out to reinvigorate China through the study of classical culture before Confucius. He edited the journal Guocui xuebao (國粹學報, National Essence), which published essays from many prominent revolutionary scholars.

Exile in Japan became necessary to avoid government suppression. In Tokyo, Liu and his wife, He Zhen, joined a group of revolutionaries who became convinced of the doctrines of anarchism. The historian Peter Zarrow calls Liu and Wu Zhihui, who led an anarchist group in Paris, "the most important Chinese theorists of anarchism." Since Tokyo was closer to China, Liu's publications, including Tianyi bao, public debates, and organizing made him the more influential of the two at home. The two groups shared basic anarchist premises: that revolution had to be social, not just political, that it had to be based on moral principle, and that education was the most important tool in carrying it out. They also agreed in condemning the class and gender hierarchy in China's heritage. Major differences soon emerged, however. The Paris group tended to see anarchism as rational and scientific progress, while Liu and the group in Tokyo were less interested in technology and progress. They respected Taoist laissez-faire thinkers who opposed government intervention in society. Liu's wife, He Zhen, contributed much to the journal may have been more radical than Liu himself.

In 1909, Liu suddenly returned to China to work for Duan Fang, a highly placed Manchu official. Duan Fang was killed when the revolution broke out in 1911, but Liu escaped to Chengdu, and engaged in teaching. Yuan Shikai appointed him to the National Assembly in 1915, and he was in the group of the "Six Gentlemen" who first called upon Yuan to become emperor. After Yuan's death, Liu moved to Tianjin, then his old friend Cai Yuanpei, who had become president of Peking University, invited him to become a professor. He died of tuberculosis in December 1919 at the age of 35.

The Yellow Emperor Chronology
Among Liu's lasting contributions was his 1903 creation of the Yellow Emperor Chronology to calculate the chronology of Chinese history. There is no evidence that this calendar was used before Liu. Chinese years were traditionally based on the year of the emperor's rule, which of course was offensive to those who wanted to overthrow the imperial system, while the Gregorian (or Western) calendar, which used the birth of Jesus, did not appeal to those who resented western imperialism. Convinced of the unbroken continuity of the Han race and Han culture from earliest times, Liu used his learning and philological training to compute the year in which the Yellow Emperor's reign began, which he determined to be 2711 BC. Liu calculated, for instance, that the international expedition sent in 1900 to suppress the Boxer Uprising entered Beijing in the 4611th year of the Yellow Emperor. This was the 庚子 (Gēngzǐ) year in the sixty-year cycle and year 26 of the Guangxu reign. Liu's system is used in Chinese publications most often alongside but not replacing the western calendar as the civil calendar.

References

Sources
 
 
 

 
 
 Joachim Kurtz. Disciplining the National Essence: Liu Shipei and the Reinvention of Ancient China's Intellectual History,  in Benjamin Ellman and Jing Tsu, (ed.),  Science and Technology in Modern China, 1880s-1940s  (Leiden: Brill,  2014). pp. 67–92.
 Liu Shipei, "Miscellaneous Notes on Literature" in Kirk Denton, ed., Modern Chinese Literary Thought: Writings on Literature, 1893- 1945 (Stanford University Press, 1995), pp. 87–89.

External links 

Chinese anarchists
Qing dynasty essayists
Qing dynasty philosophers
Tongmenghui members
Republic of China philosophers
1884 births
1919 deaths
Philosophers from Jiangsu
20th-century deaths from tuberculosis
Writers from Yangzhou
20th-century essayists
Tuberculosis deaths in China
Chinese magazine founders